Kash Rudkhaneh (also Romanized as Kash Rūdkhāneh, Kash-e Rūdkhāneh, and Kash Roodkhaneh; also known as Kash-e Rūdkhāneh-ye Qadd, Kash Rūdkhāneh Qad, Kesh Rūdkhāneh-ye Qadd, Rūdkhāneh, and Rūposhteh) is a village in Fareghan Rural District, Fareghan District, Hajjiabad County, Hormozgan Province, Iran. At the 2006 census, its population was 281, in 68 families.

References 

Populated places in Hajjiabad County